Meda is an unincorporated community on the Little Nestucca River in Tillamook County, Oregon, United States. It was named in memory of an English woman. Its post office was established on May 11, 1887, with Wallace Yates first of six more postmasters to come. The post office was closed from 1892 to 1915 before resuming service for five more years.

References

Unincorporated communities in Tillamook County, Oregon
1887 establishments in Oregon
Populated places established in 1887
Unincorporated communities in Oregon